The Summit at the Capital Centre was a 1,000-seat hockey arena located in Dimondale, Michigan, a suburb of Lansing, Michigan. It was primarily used for high school and youth hockey.

Trade shows and other meetings had also been held there.

In February 2021, after 22 years of operation, the owners of The Summit announced it would be closing after being sold. News reports state the new owner has received permits from the Windsor Township Board to operate a marijuana grow operation in the facility.

External links
Official site

Indoor ice hockey venues in the United States
Indoor arenas in Michigan
Convention centers in Michigan
Sports venues in Michigan
Sports in Lansing, Michigan
Buildings and structures in Eaton County, Michigan